Luca Henn (born 18 December 1997) is a German former racing cyclist, who rode professionally for the  team, between 2016 and 2020.

Major results
2015
 8th Overall Keizer der Juniores
2018
 1st  Young rider classification CCC Tour - Grody Piastowskie

References

External links
 

1997 births
Living people
German male cyclists
Place of birth missing (living people)